Neuwerk ((Archaic English: New Werk or Newark) is a  tidal island in the Wadden Sea on the German North Sea coast, with a population of 32.

Administratively, Neuwerk forms a homonymous quarter of the city and state of Hamburg, Germany, and is part of the borough Hamburg-Mitte. This quarter includes the islands of Scharhörn and Nigehörn, which are bird sanctuaries and closed to the public. All three islands and the Wadden Sea around them form the Hamburg Wadden Sea National Park.

Salt marshes (the "Outland"), lie outside the dikes and provide a hatchery for birds such as oystercatchers, scrays, sandwich terns, black-headed gulls, herring gulls, and others. During the summer farmers may pasture cows and horses on the northern Outland.

At low tide one can reach the island on foot or on a Wattwagen, a horse-drawn mud flat coach, from Cuxhaven. A row of poles on the mud flats marks the way. The path includes some elevated cages. These are rescue pods. Should high tide catch a walker far from shore, the walker can climb into the pod and wait for the tide to recede, or trigger a flare. Triggering the flare summons a rescue boat; rescue involves a fee and non-negligible fine.

During the summer the vessel MS Flipper makes a daily trip at high tide from the "Alte Liebe" port in Cuxhaven to the island. Because departure times depend on the tides, the times are variable. The trip takes about an hour and a half one-way.

One may, for a small fee, visit and ascend the lighthouse to a viewing platform. This provides a view of the coast and the entire island. There is a small hotel with seven guest rooms inside the lighthouse, and a hostel in a building next to the tower. Near the lighthouse there is the "graveyard of the nameless". This is a resting place for the dead bodies that in past years washed ashore. Today, bodies washed ashore are transferred to the continent.

History 

Because the Elbe was vital to Hamburg, a member of the Hanseatic League, the city's merchants with those from Bremen and Stade obtained the permission (a deed of 24 April 1286) from Albert II, Duke of Saxony and his minor nephews Albert III, Eric I and John II, altogether co-ruling feudal lords of the Land of Hadeln of which Neuwerk formed a part then, to maintain a permanent fire on a mud flat island, then named O or Nige O, in the mouth of the Elbe.

On 1 November 1299 Albert III and John II allowed the Hamburg and other seafaring merchants to build a fortified tower, named the new work (Neuwerk). Right after work commenced on a  watchtower that could act as a daymark; the tower was completed in 1310. After its completion, an alderman and ten men-at-arms seized the tower. The oldest existing document that mentions Neuwerk is a Frisian contract of 1316. This document uses the island's old name of Nige O.

The current tower dates to 1367, 1369, or 1377 (accounts vary), built after a fire destroyed its wooden predecessor. The tower is Hamburg's oldest existing building as well as the last remainder of Hamburg's fortifications.

In 1648 the tower received a beacon fire that was lit at night. The tower was converted into a lighthouse in 1814. Still, the island was the site of numerous shipwrecks.

During World War I, a shell destroyed the beacon and its signalling apparatus. On 3 September 1915 lightning struck the  Zeppelin LZ 40 (L 10), causing it to crash into the North Sea near Neuwerk, with the loss of the entire 20-man crew.

Due to the Greater Hamburg Law Neuwerk became part of Prussia in 1937, and thus after World War II it became part of the new state of Lower Saxony.

In 1946 an 18 kW wind turbine,  in diameter, installed to economize on diesel fuel, helped power the lighthouse and residences on the island. This installation ran for around 20 years before a submarine cable to the mainland replaced it.

In 1969 Hamburg waived older rights on harbour estate in Cuxhaven in favour of Neuwerk and Scharhörn.

Shipwrecks

Demographics 
On 31 December 2007, Neuwerk quarter had 39 inhabitants, 26 female and 13 males. 11 were resident aliens.

Notes

External links 
 

Frisian Islands
Islands of Hamburg
Quarters of Hamburg
Hamburg-Mitte
Nature reserves in Hamburg